In baseball, a player earns a Triple Crown when he leads a league in three specific statistical categories in the same season. The term "Triple Crown" generally refers to the batting achievement of leading a league in batting average, home runs, and runs batted in (RBI) over the same season. The term "Pitching Triple Crown" refers to the pitching achievement of leading a league in wins, strikeouts, and earned run average (ERA).

The term "Triple Crown" is typically used when a player leads one league, such as the American League (AL) or the National League (NL), in the specified categories. A tie for a lead in any category, such as home runs, is sufficient to be considered the leader in that category. A "Major League Triple Crown" may be said to occur when a player leads all of Major League Baseball in all three categories.

Batting Triple Crown

The term "Triple Crown" generally refers to the batting achievement. A batter who completes a season leading a league in batting average, home runs, and runs batted in (RBI) may be said to have won the "Triple Crown". The term, unless modified, connotes the batting achievement; it is not necessary to refer to it as the "batting" Triple Crown.

The Triple Crown reflects the ability of a batter to excel in three important ways: to hit safely a high percentage of the time (batting average); to hit the ball long distances (home runs); and to produce when runners are on base, driving them home to score (RBI). It is an uncommon feat to lead all batters in each of these categories. It has been accomplished 17 times in a major league season, most recently in 2012, by Miguel Cabrera. Cabrera's was the first since 1967, when Carl Yastrzemski accomplished the feat. Yastrzemski won the Triple Crown the year after Frank Robinson did, the only time back-to-back Triple Crowns occurred in baseball history.

Hiromitsu Ochiai is the only player to have won three batting Triple Crowns in any league winning in 1982, 1985, and 1986 while competing in the PL of the NPB. In the American major leagues, the most batting Triple Crowns won by a player is two. Rogers Hornsby was the first to accomplish it, winning his first in 1922 and then leading both major leagues in 1925 en route to his second Triple Crown, both with the St. Louis Cardinals. Ted Williams later matched this mark in the AL, winning in 1942 and 1947 with the Boston Red Sox. The Cardinals have won the most batting Triple Crowns as a franchise with four. Along with Hornsby's two, Tip O'Neill won in the now-defunct American Association in 1887 while the team was known as the St. Louis Browns, and Joe Medwick added the Cardinals' fourth in 1937. Eleven of the thirteen eligible players who have batting Triple Crowns have been elected to the Hall of Fame. Baseball writer and ESPN contributor Tim Kurkjian believes the Triple Crown has become more difficult to win with the advent of more hitters who choose to specialize in either hitting for batting average or power.

Pitching Triple Crown

A pitcher who leads the league in wins, strikeouts, and earned run average (ERA) is said to have won the "Pitching Triple Crown". The term was previously defined as leading the league in wins, ERA, and winning percentage. It was used in that older sense to describe the (ultimately unsuccessful) pursuit of that goal by Johnny Antonelli of the New York Giants in 1954 and also by Sandy Koufax in 1963. Koufax was first described as having won the Pitching Triple Crown in the current sense after his 1965 season though the older sense continued to be used.

In contrast to the respective batting statistics, the Pitching Triple Crown statistics are more or less complementary (for example, a pitcher who is especially proficient at striking out batters is likely to give up fewer earned runs, and consequently more likely to win games); therefore, the accomplishment is not as rare as the batting crown.

In the major leagues, the Pitching Triple Crown has been accomplished 39 times. The most by one player is three, accomplished by three players. Grover Cleveland Alexander captured his first two in consecutive seasons with the Philadelphia Phillies (1915–1916), and won a third in 1920 with the Chicago Cubs. Alexander is the only pitcher to win a Pitching Triple Crown with more than one major league team. Walter Johnson won his three Triple Crowns with the original Washington Senators, leading the league in all three categories in 1913, 1918, and 1924. Sandy Koufax was the most recent to capture three Triple Crowns, winning his three within four seasons for the Los Angeles Dodgers (1963, 1965–1966); all of Koufax's crowns led both major leagues, the most for any player.

Other major league pitchers who have won multiple Pitching Triple Crowns include Christy Mathewson (1905 and 1908 New York Giants), Lefty Grove (1930 and 1931 Philadelphia Athletics), Lefty Gomez (1934 and 1937 New York Yankees), and Roger Clemens (1997 and 1998 Toronto Blue Jays).

One pitcher, Guy Hecker, won a Triple Crown in a defunct 19th century major league; he led the American Association in wins, strikeouts, and ERA in 1884 while pitching for the Louisville Colonels.

Eighteen of twenty-four major league pitchers who have won a Triple Crown and are eligible for the Hall of Fame have been inducted. The Triple Crown winners who most recently became eligible for the Hall are Pedro Martínez and Randy Johnson. Both were elected to the Hall of Fame in 2015, each in their first year of eligibility.

The most recent major league pitcher to achieve the feat is Shane Bieber in 2020.

Major league records
The first major league pitcher to achieve the pitching Triple Crown was Tommy Bond, in the NL in 1877. The following year, Paul Hines became the first major leaguer to lead the NL in the three batting categories; he, Heinie Zimmerman, and Miguel Cabrera are the only three players to be AL or NL Triple Crown winners and not reach the Hall of Fame, although Cabrera  is still playing so therefore ineligible. The highest home run total reached by a Crown winner was Mickey Mantle, with 52 in 1956. The highest RBI total belongs to Lou Gehrig, with 165 in 1934. Rogers Hornsby has the highest home run total by an NL winner, 42, from his 1922 season. The NL high for RBI is 154, set by Joe Medwick in 1937. Hugh Duffy's .440 average in his 1894 Triple Crown season is the highest batting average by any player in major league history. Nap Lajoie, in 1901, set the all-time AL single-season high in batting average with .426.

Among the major leaguers who earned the pitching Triple Crown, the lowest ERAs belong to Walter Johnson (1.14 in 1913 AL) and Grover Alexander (1.22 in 1915 NL). The highest win total belongs to Charles Radbourn, amassed in 1884, who in that year set a major league single-season record with at least 59 wins. Radbourn struck out 441 batters that season, the highest total for a Triple Crown winner. Walter Johnson holds the highest win total by an AL pitching Triple Crown winner, with 36, attained in 1913. Among AL pitching Triple Crown winners, Pedro Martínez registered the highest season strikeout total, with 313 in 1999. Since 1901, the major league pitcher with the highest season strikeout total in the course of a Triple Crown season is Sandy Koufax, striking out 382 in 1965.

Triple Crown winners
Key

Major League Baseball

Batting

Research in 2015 restored the Chicago Cubs' Heinie Zimmerman of 1912 to the list. There is doubt over whether Hugh Duffy's 1894 RBI totals were the highest.

Pitching

Negro league baseball
On December 16, 2020, Major League Baseball announced that the records of Negro league baseball from 1920 to 1948 would be designated as major league status. As such, seven different leagues that existed in that time period are now recognized as being on the same level as MLB. Seven batters and three pitchers achieved the Triple Crown in that era.

Batting

Pitching

Nippon Professional Baseball

Batting

Pitching

See also

Cy Young Award
Hank Aaron Award
List of Major League Baseball awards
Major League Baseball Most Valuable Player Award

Notes

References
General

Inline citations

Triple Crown
Triple Crown
Triple Crown
Triple